Wilusz is a Polish surname, a form of Wilhelm. Notable people with the surname include: 

Jeffrey Wilusz, American microbiologist
Maciej Wilusz (born 1988), Polish footballer

Polish-language surnames